Donald Lewis Montague is a Canadian-American watersport athlete and designer. He is President of Kai Concepts, co-founder of Makani Power, and the head of the Kiteboat Project in Alameda, California.

Career

In 1982, Montague moved from Canada to Santa Barbara, CA, and then to Maui, HI to pursue a career in windsurfing. After touring professionally in the Windsurfing World Cup, Montague began designing sails and other windsurfing equipment as Head Sail Designer at Gaastra Sails. Later, while working as the head of Research & Development at Naish, Montague became interested in the idea of using kites to harness wind power in watersports. While being involved in the development of the first kites for Naish in 1997, and helping to create software that increased the speed of kite design modifications, Montague became an avid kitesurfer. In 2006, his interest in wind-related technology led him to engineers and fellow kitesurfers Corwin Hardham and Saul Griffith, and together they created Makani Power, an Alameda, California-based company that develops airborne wind turbines for commercial use. Makani (the Hawaiian word for "gentle breeze") was acquired by Google X in May 2013 and is still considered a pioneer in wind powered energy systems.

Kiteboat Project
Montague’s interest in kite power led him to create the Kiteboat Project. Currently the project is part of Kai Concepts, a Bay Area team known for testing the limits of kite propulsion and experimenting with technological advances in watersport technology.

Jetfoiler
More recently, Kai Concepts expanded their program to include electric motor research, most notably converting the kiteboat into an electric foiling system (efoil), representing the next logical step in hydrofoil technology by pairing a hydrofoil with an electric motor. Constructed from the same quality composites used in high-end race boats, the board and foil are light, strong, and low-drag, allowing the device to take full advantage of the provided power.

References

External links
 Kai Concepts official website
 Makani Power official website

Year of birth missing (living people)
Living people
Canadian kitesurfers
American kitesurfers
Male kitesurfers
American sportsmen